Hello America may refer to:

Hello America, a 1981 novel by J. G. Ballard
"Hello America" (song), a song by Def Leppard from their album On Through the Night
Hello America (album), a 1992 album by Blue System
Hello America (film), a 1998 Egyptian film starring Adel Emam
Hello America, the fictional morning television show from the Nicolas Cage film The Weather Man